Edward Theodore McClintock (born May 27, 1967) is an American actor, best known for his role of Secret Service agent Pete Lattimer on the Syfy series Warehouse 13.

Early life

McClintock was born in Canton, Ohio, and raised by his father Theodore "Ted" McClintock (died 2022). After his parents' divorce, he moved with his father to North Canton. After leaving St. Michael's Catholic School in the eighth grade, he attended North Canton Hoover High School. 

McClintock graduated with a degree in communications from Wright State University in Dayton and studied design in college. In 2007, he designed the artwork for Puscifer's album "V" Is for Vagina and currently sells some of his artwork on his personal website. Working as a wrestler and later a production assistant, he subsequently took up acting and began appearing in roles in 1997.

Career

To date, McClintock has appeared in ten pilots, starred in five network series, worked on several television films, and made well over 45 guest appearances on more than 25 different shows. He was a cast member on the sitcom Stark Raving Mad from 1999 to 2000, which won the People's Choice Award but was cancelled after one season. In 2006, he appeared on Desperate Housewives as Frank, the father of Gabrielle and Carlos' adoptive baby. He appeared as Special Agent Tim Sullivan in four episodes of Bones in 2007. He has also guest-starred on Sex and the City, My Boys, Felicity, Friends, Ned and Stacey, Less than Perfect, Better Off Ted, Monk, and The King of Queens.

He is known for his role in Syfy's Warehouse 13. BuddyTV ranked him number eighty-two on its list of "TV's Sexiest Men of 2011". McClintock later recurred on No Good Nick as Nick's incarcerated father, Tony Franzelli.

He took on the role of a father whose teen son was diagnosed with a life-threatening form of brain cancer in Miracle at Manchester, which was released in early 2023.

Personal life 
He married Lynn Sanchez in 2005; the couple have two sons.

Filmography

References

External links

 

1967 births
20th-century American male actors
21st-century American male actors
American male film actors
American male television actors
Living people
Male actors from Ohio
People from Canton, Ohio
Wright State University alumni
People from North Canton, Ohio